Crew Dragon C205 is a Crew Dragon capsule manufactured and built by SpaceX. It completed its first, and of January 2023, only flight on January 19, 2020, with the Crew Dragon In-Flight Abort Test mission where the capsule detached from the Falcon 9 B1046 booster at max q using the SuperDraco abort thrusters. This was done to test the functionality of the abort thrusters in an operational rocket launch.

Background
Dragon C205 was originally planned to be used on the Demo-2 mission and the Crew Dragon C204 capsule was intended to be used for the in flight abort test. However, the Dragon C204 capsule was destroyed during testing which caused SpaceX to change the Dragon C205 to this mission and Crew Dragon Endeavour completed the Demo-2 mission.

In-Flight Abort Test
The In-Flight Abort Test was completed as part of the CCDev by NASA to test the Dragon 2's launch escape system with the SuperDraco thrusters, before a Crew Dragon capsule could carry astronauts onboard for the Demo-2 mission. The flight path of the rocket was set to imitate a crewed launch in order to match stresses of a normal flight. The launch escape test started with the rocket liftoff at 15:30 (UTC). The launch abort was triggered 90 seconds after liftoff, with C205 splashing down in the Atlantic Ocean at 15:38 (UTC) after descending under parachutes.

Recovery

The SpaceX recovery ship GO Navigator recovered the capsule where C205 was taken back to Port Canaveral for inspection. While the trunk which separated from the capsule at the flight path apogee of approximately 40 km was recovered by a second recovery ship GO Searcher, which returned to the port after the first ship carrying the capsule.

Flights

See also
Crew Dragon In-Flight Abort Test
Development of the Commercial Crew Program
Crew Dragon Endeavour
Crew Dragon C201

References

Individual space vehicles
Uncrewed spacecraft
SpaceX Dragon 2
NASA spacecraft
Cargo spacecraft